Space Shower Music Awards (old name: SPACE SHOWER Music Video Awards, abbr. to SPACE SHOWER MVA) are an annual set of music awards sponsored by Japanese Space Shower TV. The prizes have been awarded since 1996.

Winners in main categories

Best Video of the Year

Best Artist / Best Director

Best Your Choice 

People's Choice

Album & Song of the Year

Other Awards for Artists

Special Award

Most wins overall 
Updated till 2020.

References

External links 
 

Awards established in 1996
1996 establishments in Japan
Japanese music awards